The Brown-class destroyer is a class of destroyers of the Argentine Navy.

Development 

After World War II, they were in a mothball state, but In August 1961, they were handed over to Argentina based on the Argentina-US Ship Loan Agreement. All ships were decommissioned by the time of the Falklands War, to save resources for the war. ARA Almirante Storni fired warning shots and then live shots in the bow of the British oceanic research vessel Shackleton on 2 April 1976.

Ships in the class

References

Bibliography 
 
 

Destroyer classes
Brown-class destroyers
Falklands War naval ships of Argentina